Usseau may refer to the following places in France:

 Usseau, Deux-Sèvres, a commune in the Deux-Sèvres department
 Usseau, Vienne, a commune in the Vienne department